Langbaurgh Ridge is an 8.0 hectare geological Site of Special Scientific Interest near the hamlet of Langbaurgh in North Yorkshire, England, notified in 1986.  The site crosses the boundary of the Redcar and Cleveland district and Hambleton District.

The site is identified as being of national importance in the Geological Conservation Review for its exposure of the Cleveland Dyke, a Palaeogene intrusion associated with the Mull central volcanic complex.

References

Sources
 English Nature citation sheet for the site  (accessed 5 August 2006)

External links
 English Nature (SSSI information)
 Site boundary map at English Nature's "Nature on the Map" website

Sites of Special Scientific Interest in Cleveland, England
Sites of Special Scientific Interest in North Yorkshire
Sites of Special Scientific Interest notified in 1986
Mountains and hills of North Yorkshire